The Sheffield City Council election was held on 9 May 1963, with one third up for vote and two vacancies in Attercliffe and Tinsley. The election, boasting a record field of candidates, seen Labour win back all their 1960 losses as well as gaining Hillsborough. The Ratepayers Association's failure to contest these elections meant their sole representation on the council, as one of the Firth Park councillors, was lost. Overall turnout was unchanged from the previous years, at 31%.

Election result

The result had the following consequences for the total number of seats on the Council after the elections:

Ward results

References

Sheffield
Sheffield City Council elections
City Council election, 1963
Sheffield City Council election